Jerry Mawihmingthanga (born 9 March 1997) is an Indian professional footballer who plays as a winger for Indian Super League club Odisha.

Career

DSK Shivajians
Born in Mizoram, Mawihmingthana started his career with the DSK Shivajians Academy. In March 2016, Mawihmingthana, along with teammate Lallianzuala Chhangte, went to train with Liverpool Reserves in England.

Loan to NorthEast United
On 16 May 2016, it was announced that Mawihmingthana, along with Chhangte, would sign on loan for NorthEast United of the Indian Super League from DSK Shivajians. He made his debut for the team on 7 October 2016 against Mumbai City. He came on in the 72nd minute for Rowllin Borges.

Return to DSK Shivajians
After NorthEast United failed to qualify for the finals, Mawihmingthana returned to DSK Shivajians, only playing one match for NorthEast United. He made his senior debut for the club in their first match of the season against Mumbai. He started and played the whole match as DSK Shivajians lost 1–0.

On 11 March 2017, Mawihmingthanga scored his first professional goal against Mumbai. He found the net in the 83rd minute as DSK Shivajians went on to win 5–0. He then scored his second goal of his career a month later against East Bengal on 17 April 2017. His 29th minute strike was the only goal in a 1–0 victory for DSK Shivajians.

Jamshedpur
On 23 July 2017, after completing his season with DSK Shivajians, Mawihmingthanga was selected in the seventh round of the 2017–18 ISL Players Draft by Jamshedpur for the 2017–18 Indian Super League season. He made his debut for Jamshedpur in their first ever match on 18 November 2017 against his former club NorthEast United. He started and played the whole match as Jamshedpur drew 0–0.

On 17 January 2018, Mawihmingthanga scored his first competitive goal in the Indian Super League in a 2–1 victory against the Kerala Blasters. He opened the scoring just 22 seconds into the match, the fastest goal in Indian Super League history. Over the course of the two seasons he spend at Jamshedpur, he would end up scoring once and assisting 4 times.

Odisha
Jerry signed for newly re-branded Odisha for the 2019–20 Indian Super League season, where he would play 17 times, scoring twice and assisting 5 times. The 2020–21 season would be a disappointing one for his team finishing bottom of the table despite Jerry scoring twice and assisting 5 times during the season to match his numbers from his first season.

On 22 April 2021, Odisha announced contract extension with Jerry. He had a good 2021–22 season with 3 assists and 2 goals, but Odisha failed to qualify for the 2021–22 ISL playoffs. On 17 August 2022, he scored a brace in the 2022 Durand Cup season opener against NorthEast United, which ended in a thumping 6–0 win for Odisha.

International
Mawihmingthana has represented India at the under-19 level. In July 2017, after his season with DSK Shivajians, Mawihmingthanga was selected to be part of the India U23 side.

Career statistics

Club

Honours

India U23
 South Asian Games Silver medal: 2016

Individual
FPAI Young Player of the Year: 2019–20

References

External links 
 Indian Super League Profile
 Jamshedpur FC Profile

1997 births
Living people
Footballers from Mizoram
Indian footballers
DSK Shivajians FC players
NorthEast United FC players
Jamshedpur FC players
Association football midfielders
Indian Super League players
I-League players
India youth international footballers
Odisha FC players
South Asian Games silver medalists for India
South Asian Games medalists in football